David G. Grigoryan (born 17 July 1989), is a retired Armenian football midfielder who made one appearance for the Armenia national football team.

Career statistics

International

References

External links
 

Living people
1989 births
Armenian footballers
Armenia international footballers
FC Ararat Yerevan players
Association football midfielders